Avatoru Pass is located on the northwestern portion of the Rangiroa lagoon in the Tuamotu Islands of French Polynesia. It is located immediately to the West of the village of Avatoru. There are only two major passes on Rangiroa, the other being Tiputa Pass. The pass is a popular scuba diving location, although the Tiputa Pass is generally preferred by divers.

See also

Tiputa Pass

References

Landforms of the Tuamotus